Georgy Noevich Reviya (born 3 April 1999) is a Russian-Georgian ice dancer who competes for Georgia. With his skating partner Maria Kazakova, he is the 2021 CS Nebelhorn Trophy and 2019 CS Asian Open bronze medalist. 

On the junior level, he is the 2020 World Junior silver medalist, the 2019 Junior Grand Prix Final champion, the 2019 JGP Croatia champion, the 2018 Toruń Cup champion, the 2019 NRW Trophy champion and the 2018 Volvo Open Cup champion.

Personal life 
Reviya was born on 3 April 1999 in Odintsovo, Russia. He is of Georgian heritage and holds dual Russian and Georgian citizenship. Reviya currently studies business management at university and hopes to open a skating school in Georgia one day.

Career

Early years 
Reviya began learning to skate in 2003 at the age of four. He previously competed with Eva Khachaturian for Georgia and Ksenia Konkina for Russia.

2017–2018 season 
In 2017, Reviya teamed up with Maria Kazakova to compete for Georgia. During the 2017–2018 season, the team appeared at four international events – the Toruń Cup, the Golden Spin of Zagreb, the Santa Claus Cup, and the Tallinn Trophy. In March, they placed ninth at the 2018 World Junior Championships in Sofia, Bulgaria.

2018–2019 season 
Kazakova/Reviya made their ISU Junior Grand Prix (JGP) debut in September at the 2018 JGP Czech Republic. They finished second in both the rhythm dance and the free dance to earn the silver medal overall behind Russian gold medalists Elizaveta Khudaiberdieva / Nikita Nazarov and ahead of Russian bronze medalists Davis/Smolkin.

At their next Junior Grand Prix event, in Armenia, Kazakova/Reviya placed second in both segments, behind Russia's Ushakova/Nekrasov, and received another silver medal. They set a new personal best score of 65.42 in the rhythm dance.  They became the first ice dancers representing Georgia to qualify to a Junior Grand Prix Final, where they finished sixth.

Kazakova/Reviya concluded the season at the 2019 World Junior Championships, where they placed sixth.  Reviya called their performance there "not our season’s best, but the best skate of the season. There were some technical mistakes, and we’ll work on them, but I’m happy my partner and I are moving in the right direction."

2019–2020 season: Senior debut and World Junior silver medalists 

Kazakova/Reviya began their season in early September at the 2019 JGP Latvia. Though they won the free dance at this event by a little under two points, they placed second overall behind the Russian team and training mates Khudaiberdieva/ Filatov by about 0.3 points after being at a deficit after the rhythm dance. Despite missing gold, the team set new personal bests in the free dance and overall at the event. At their second assignment, 2019 JGP Croatia, Kazakova/Reviya earned their first Junior Grand Prix title, taking first place by a 15-point margin over Russian silver medalists Tyutyunina/Shustitskiy. The team set new personal bests in both the rhythm dance and the free dance as well as overall, and with their win qualified for the Junior Grand Prix Final for the second season in a row.

Kazakova/Reviya made their senior international debut in early November 2019 at the 2019 CS Asian Open Figure Skating Trophy. The team placed third in the rhythm dance and second in the free dance to finish third overall behind the American team Carreira/Ponomarenko and Russian team (including Reviya's former partner) Konkina/Drozd. The pair also set new personal bests in all three segments at the event. Days later, Kazakova/Reviya competed in the senior category again at the 2019 Volvo Open Cup in Riga, Latvia. They placed second in both the rhythm dance and the free dance behind the Russian team Shevchenko/Eremenko to win the silver medal overall.

In December 2019, Kazakova/Reviya returned to the junior level to compete at the 2019–20 Junior Grand Prix Final in Torino, Italy. The team took the lead in the rhythm dance by just a 0.04 point margin over the American team Nguyen/Kolesnik and again set a new personal best (68.76). After their performance, Reviya remarked, "It wasn't easy today. We are very happy with our marks, but not so happy with the skate," citing a few minor technical errors that the team will look to work on moving forward. On splitting their season between the junior and senior circuit, Reviya further added, "It's hard, so hard! But the free dance in juniors is easier after skating in seniors." During the following day of competition, Kazakova/Reviya continued their momentum from the rhythm dance by placing first in the free dance by a 0.12 point margin over the Americans to capture their first Junior Grand Prix Final title. Their win marks the first Junior Grand Prix Final victory by an entrant from Georgia in any discipline. After their win, Kazakova stated, "It's a great pleasure for us just to skate and especially to skate for Georgia."

In January 2020, Kazakova/Reviya competed at the 2020 European Championships, their first senior ISU championship. The team placed twelfth in the rhythm dance, scoring just shy of their personal best score and qualifying for the free dance. The couple fell to fourteenth place in the free dance and ultimately ranked fourteenth overall.

Kazakova/Reviya next competed in early March 2020 at the 2020 World Junior Figure Skating Championships in Tallinn, Estonia. The team set a new personal best in the rhythm dance and finished second in the segment behind Russian team Shanaeva/Naryzhnyy and ahead of American rivals Nguyen/Kolesnik. In the free dance, Kazakova/Reviya outscored Shanaeva/Naryzhnyy, but were overtaken by Nguyen/Kolesnik, leaving the team once again in second in the segment and second overall. Their silver medal marks Georgia's first ISU championship medal in ice dance.

They had been assigned to make their senior World Championship debut in Montreal, but these were cancelled as a result of the coronavirus pandemic.

2020–2021 season 
Kazakova/Reviya were assigned to make their Grand Prix debut at the 2020 Rostelecom Cup, but withdrew. Later in the season, the team was assigned to the 2021 World Championships, but withdrew prior to the publication of the entry list due to health issues.

2021–2022 season: Beijing Olympics 
Kazakova/Reviya returned to competition after a season away due to injury at the 2021 CS Nebelhorn Trophy, attempting to qualify a berth for Georgia in ice dance at the 2022 Winter Olympics. They placed fifth in the rhythm dance due primarily to a mistake made by Reviya on their third set of twizzles but were able to remain in contention for Olympic qualification. In the free dance, Kazakova/Reviya came back with a stronger performance to finish second in the segment, scoring just shy of their personal best and finishing third overall to successfully qualify for a spot in their discipline for Georgia at the Olympic Games.     

At their next assignment, the 2021 Mezzaluna Cup, Kazakova/Reviya placed first in both segments of competition to take the title by a 15-point margin over Australian silver medalists Kerry/Dodds. They were scheduled to compete at the 2021 CS Cup of Austria, the 2021 CS Warsaw Cup, and the 2021 Rostelecom Cup, but withdrew from all three events due to injury. Due to equipment issues, the team also skipped the 2022 European Championships] in January.

Kazakova/Reviya began the 2022 Winter Olympics as the Georgian entries to the rhythm dance segment of the Olympic team event. They placed eighth in the segment, taking three points for the Georgian team. Ultimately the team did not advance to the second phase of the competition and finished sixth. In the dance event, Kazakova/Reviya were eighteenth in the rhythm dance, qualifying for the free dance. Nineteenth in the free dance, they finished nineteenth overall.

The team concluded the season at the 2022 World Championships, held in Montpellier with Russian dance teams absent due to the International Skating Union banning all Russian athletes due to their country's invasion of Ukraine. They finished fifteenth.

2022–2023 season 
Before the start of the 2022–23 season, Kazakova and Reviya left Russia and long-time coaches Denis Samokhin and Maria Borovikova and relocated to Egna, Italy to train under Matteo Zanni and Barbora Řezníčková. They said that training outside Russia would be beneficial in light of the ongoing war in Ukraine.

After withdrawing from two early events, Kazakova/Reviya opened their season by making their ISU Grand Prix debut at the 2022 Grand Prix de France in November. They placed sixth in both the rhythm and free dance to finish sixth overall. They were sixth as well at the 2022 MK John Wilson Trophy the following weekend.

In their second appearance at the European Championships, Kazakova/Reviya finished eighth.

Programs

With Kazakova

With Khachaturian

With Konkina

Records and achievements

Junior world record scores 
Kazakova/Reviya are the former junior world record holders for the free dance and total scores.

Competitive highlights 
CS: Challenger Series; JGP: Junior Grand Prix

With Kazakova for Georgia

With Khachaturian for Georgia

With Konkina for Russia

Detailed results 
Small medals for short and free programs awarded only at ISU Championships.

With Kazakova

Senior results

Junior results

References

External links 
 

! colspan="3" style="border-top: 5px solid #78FF78;" |World Junior Record Holders

1999 births
Living people
Russian male ice dancers
Male ice dancers from Georgia (country)
Figure skaters from Moscow
World Junior Figure Skating Championships medalists
Russian people of Georgian descent
Figure skaters at the 2022 Winter Olympics
Olympic figure skaters of Georgia (country)